Kingdom of Noise is a studio album by the Welsh rock band Man and was released 9 June 2009.

This is the second of studio releases not to feature any of the original members and the first to feature drummer Rene Robrahn.

Track listing 
 "Shadow of the Hand" (Ace) – 5:53
 "Steal the World" (Ace, Josh Ace) – 4:18
 "Iceflowers" (Ace, Engel) – 4:46
 "Russian Roulette" (Ace, Engel) – 7:04
 "Kingdom of Noise" (Ace, Josh Ace) – 3:52
 "Standing in the Rain" (Ace) – 4:47
 "Speak" (Ace, Josh Ace) – 3:55
 "Chuffin' Like a Muffin" (Ace, Engel) – 4:43
 "Dissolve into Despair" (Ace, Josh Ace) – 4:13

Personnel 
 Josh Ace – guitar, vocals
 Allan Murdoch – guitar, engineer
 Phil Ryan – keyboards, producer
 Martin Ace – bass, vocals
 René Robrahn – drums
 Bob Richards – percussion, drums, background vocals

Reception

AllMusic said although Kingdom of Noise had a different sound from previous albums, the album could become of their favourite albums by Man.

References

External links 
 

2009 albums
Man (band) albums